Chahar Taq (also Romanized as Chahār Ţāq) is a village in Kheyrgu Rural District, Alamarvdasht District, Lamerd County, Fars Province, Iran. At the 2006 census, its population was 402, in 83 families.

References 

Populated places in Lamerd County